Erigeron morrisonensis is an Asian species of flowering plants in the family Asteraceae. It grows in grasslands, rocky slopes, and coniferous forest in Taiwan.

Erigeron morrisonensis is a perennial, clump-forming herb up to 20 cm (8 inches) tall, forming a shortunderground rhizomes. Its flower heads have lilac or pale purple ray florets surrounding yellow disc florets.

References

morrisonensis
Endemic flora of Taiwan
Plants described in 1908